Samir Mehanović is a Bosnian and British BAFTA and IDFA award-winning film director, producer, and screenwriter. He came to the United Kingdom as an immigrant from the Bosnian war and has lived in UK since 1995. Samir developed his crafts as writer and director by creating theatre productions and improvising with actors. In 2005 he completed an MA in Film and TV at the Edinburgh College of Art. In 2017 Samir was nominated for the  UK BAFTAs and received the Grand Prix Award at the 22nd International Short Film Festival in Drama, Greece 2016 - both for the short film 'Mouth of Hell'. He won the  IDFA Special Jury Award for the documentary 'The Fog of Srebrenica'  and also the BAFTA SCOTLAND award for the short film 'The Way We Played'.

Early life
Mehanović was the youngest of five sons in a family of coal miners. His father survived a mine explosion but was unable to continue mine work. He found new employment as an usher and janitor at Moša Pijade, the Bosnian Cultural Centre in Tuzla, moving his family there. Young Mehanović often visited Moša Pijade and was inspired by the work of theatre companies from Eastern Europe and Russia.

During the Bosnian War, the siege of Tuzla[1] by Serb forces put an end to Mehanović's studies. He established JLS Avantgarde Theatre company, developing as a director, learning together with his actors and creating groundbreaking plays. On 25 May 1995, Samir had just arrived at the theatre for rehearsals when the Tuzla massacre occurred. He was saved, but 71 young people were killed. Two months later, in July, Mehanović witnessed the arrival of refugees, mostly women and children, from the Srebrenica genocide.

Mehanović left Tuzla with his theatre company to perform at the Edinburgh Festival Fringe, invited by Richard Demarco OBE, co-founder of the Traverse Theatre. Mehanović remained in Edinburgh and applied for asylum, briefly living on the streets before finding a council flat in Niddrie, a suburb of Edinburgh, at the time one of the most deprived areas in Scotland.[2][3]

Career
Mehanović continued directing theatre in Edinburgh and in 2001 directed his first short film, 'Pigs Flying Pink'. In 2004 he completed an MA in Film and TV at the Edinburgh College of Art, winning the Ingles Allen Award (2004) for Best MA Film with 'Game Over'. The following year, he wrote and directed the short film 'The Way We Played', about two boys from different religious backgrounds at the beginning of the Bosnian war. He won the Best First Time Director BAFTA Scotland award (2005) for this, and the Houston Film Festival Silver Award (2006)[4]. Samir made his TV debut directing for BBC Artworks in 2008 with 'Class Enemy: A Message from Sarajevo', a 30-minute documentary completed within a two-month schedule. The same year he directed 'Richard and I', a deeply personal documentary on his relationship with art impresario Richard Demarco. In 2011, Mehanović attended the Binger Director's Lab, Amsterdam. In 2014, he directed the short film 'Mouth of Hell' (2015), filmed on location in Jharia, India.

In 2015, commissioned by the BBC, he made a film about the Srebrenica genocide 'The Fog of Srebrenica'. This won the IDFA Special Jury Award as well as the Amnesty International Award at Ljubljana Doc Fest and also Best Cinematography Award at SEE Fest in LA.

In 2016 'Mouth of Hell' was awarded Grand Prix Award at Drama ISFF, Greece and it was nominated for Best Short film at 2017 UK BAFTAs.

During 2014-2018 Mehanovic filmed/directed/produced 'Through Our eyes', a film about Syrian refugees that premiered April 2018 at the Bertha Dochouse at Curzon Bloomsbury London and also was screened throughout UK in cinemas.

In 2018/19 he produced and directed the documentary 'Spank the Banker', and is developing feature length script.

Personal life 

Mehanovic's daughter Isla (Ajla in Bosnian) was born in Edinburgh in 2010 and lives in London. His family lives in an extended - family house in Tuzla.

Stage

Film

References

External links
 Showreel
 The Way We Played (2005) - watch film
 BBC Artworks documentary Class Enemy: A Message from Sarajevo
 Anant (2015) - trailer
 BAFTA Scotland
 Binger Director’s Lab, Amsterdam
 Film Directing MA, Edinburgh College of Art
 

British film directors
Bosnia and Herzegovina film directors
Living people
Alumni of the Edinburgh College of Art
Year of birth missing (living people)